Public Health Engineering Organisation (PHEO) is a public agency formed in 1956 by the Government of Odisha, under the administrative control of Housing and Urban Development Department assigned with task of providing water supply and sewerage facilities to the urban parts in the state of Odisha.

References

External links
 Public Health Engineering Organization website

State agencies of Odisha
Companies based in Bhubaneswar
Water management authorities in India
1956 establishments in Orissa
Government agencies established in 1956